José Luis Caicedo Barrera (born 23 May 2002) is a Colombian footballer who plays as a midfielder and/or defense for UNAM.

Career statistics

Club

Notes

References

2002 births
Living people
Colombian footballers
Colombian expatriate footballers
Colombia youth international footballers
Association football midfielders
Categoría Primera A players
Liga de Expansión MX players
Categoría Primera B players
Independiente Santa Fe footballers
Barranquilla F.C. footballers
People from Palmira, Valle del Cauca
Colombian expatriate sportspeople in Mexico
Expatriate footballers in Mexico
Sportspeople from Valle del Cauca Department
21st-century Colombian people